In the field of astrology, generational planets are planets that affect an entire generation of people.  The generational planets are the outer planets Uranus, Neptune, Pluto, Sedna, and Quaoar.

Uranus was discovered by amateur astronomer William Herschel on 13 March 1781. Uranus exhibits the ideals of the 18th century, where people such as Benjamin Franklin endeavoured to use their inventive mind to move man into a more enlightened era.  It has an orbit of 84 years, staying in each sign of the zodiac for approximately 7 years.  Uranus is considered to be a higher octave of Mercury, which means that as people develop within their selves, their character and means of communication will exhibit more influences of the sign and house of Uranus.  In essence, Uranus can be seen as a person's higher self.  Because it takes Uranus 84 years to travel through the zodiac, transiting Uranus just might conjoin the natal Uranus within a person's lifetime.

Neptune was discovered on 23 September 1846.  Neptune is a 19th-century planet in that it heralded in many of the varied assortment of Protestant religions, as well as spiritualism, took hold.  Visionaries such as Edgar Cayce and Rudolf Steiner were born in the second half of the 19th century, and their psychic abilities are indicative of the Neptunian themes of this time. It has an orbit of 165 years, which is approximately twice the time of Uranus.  Neptune is considered to be the higher octave of Venus because both planet's are gaseous and both strive to achieve the higher ideals of mankind; Venus through the adoption of beauty and Neptune through unconditional love.  Because Neptune has such a long orbit, an individual may see transiting Neptune form an opposition to their natal Neptune.

Pluto was discovered by Clyde W. Tombaugh on 18 February 1930.  When Pluto was first discovered, it was initially known as Planet X.  Astronomers had been searching for another planet past Neptune, hoping to solve the dilemma of its rather irregular orbit.  It is now known, however, that the perceived irregular orbit of Neptune was the result of a mathematical error because Pluto, being a planetoid smaller than our own Moon, was far too small to affect any type of gravitational pull on the gas giant.  Pluto is very much a 20th-century planet and refers to the two world wars, and weapons of mass destruction, nuclear power, and a desire to totally control the world we live in.  It is a planet that reveals to us the extremes we are capable of if we do not set necessary boundaries in our lives.  This planet governs the compulsions in our life:  those things we are compelled to do but know we should not, such as murder, rape, drug addiction, and even overeating if it is of such an extent that it threatens our health. Pluto is considered to be a higher octave of Mars, and this is evidenced by the fact that both planets co-rule Scorpio.  Pluto, circling the Sun in 248 years, has a rather elliptical orbit, which means that it stays in the sign it rules, Scorpio, for a mere 12 years, and the sign of its fall, Taurus for 30!  With this in mind, some astrologers believe that Pluto should rightfully rule Taurus, but for the time being it still rules Scorpio.  As other trans-Neptunian object planets are discovered, however, this placement just might have to be reconsidered.

Quaoar was discovered on 4 June 2002  and is considered to be a trans-Neptunian object.  Although a planetoid, it is considered by many to be more of a planet than Pluto because its orbit is more circular in nature, being 286 years.  When a person is around 71 years old, transiting Quaoar will form a square aspect to his natal placement.  Since this is a recently discovered object, not much is yet known about its astrological significance and what part it plays in the universe.

Sedna was discovered by a team using the Samuel Oschin telescope on 14 November 2003 and is a trans-Neptunian object.  It has an orbit of 11,250 years, so stays in a sign for approximately a millennium.  Because this planet has recently been discovered, not much is yet known about it.

See also
Personal planet
Planets in Astrology - Modern Planets

Citations

Technical factors of astrology
History of astrology